Gran may refer to:

People
Grandmother, affectionately known as "gran"
Gran (name)

Places 
 Gran, the historical German name for Esztergom, a city and the primatial metropolitan see of Hungary
 Gran, Norway, a municipality in Innlandet county, Norway
 Gran (village), a village in Gran Municipality in Innlandet county, Norway
 Grän, a municipality in the state of Tyrol, Austria
 Gran (island), an island in Nordanstig Municipality, Gävleborg County, Sweden

Spanish language
In Spanish Gran means "Great" or "Greater", and may refer to:

 Gran Canaria, an island of the Canary Islands, Spain
 Gran Colombia, a modern name for a former South American country called Colombia
 Gran Sabana, a natural region in Venezuela
 Gran Chaco, a South American lowland natural region
 Gran Asunción (Greater Asunción), Paraguay
 Gran Chimú Province, a province of La Libertad Region of Peru
 Gran Torre Santiago, a skyscraper in Santiago, Chile
 Big Brother (franchise), called "Gran Hermano" in Hispanic countries
 La Gran Cruzada, a professional Mexican wrestling event
 Gran Campo Nevado, a small ice field in Chile
 Gran Pajatén,  an archaeological site located in the Andean cloud forests of Peru

Other
 Gran Brigitte, another name for Maman Brigitte
 Widely used, predominantly British, abbreviation for grandmother
 Gran (TV series) children's animation from the early 80's
 Gran plot, a graphing technique in analytical chemistry developed by Gustav Gran
 Ruth "Gran" Sims, a character in the Australian mockumentary series Angry Boys
 Gran (Star Wars), a fictional alien species in the Star Wars franchise
KM-8 Gran

See also

 
 Gran Turismo (disambiguation)
 Gran Via (disambiguation)
 Grand (disambiguation)